Doris tricolor is a species of sea slug, a dorid nudibranch, a marine gastropod mollusc in the family Dorididae.

Distribution
This species was described from Japan. It was later redescribed and compared with Doris sugashimae. It has been reported from 2 m depth at Kazino hama, Jogashima, Miura Peninsula.

References

Dorididae
Gastropods described in 1938